MS Seatruck Panorama is a ro-ro freight ferry operated by Seatruck Ferries.

The vessel was built in 2007 by Spanish shipyard Astilleros de Huelva as Clipper Panorama. The vessel entered service in January 2009.

History
Clipper Panorama was built by Astilleros de Huelva, Spain as yard number 822. Her keel was laid on 13 March 2007 and she was launched on 27 December, with completion on 13 November 2008. Homeported in Limassol, Cyprus, she is employed on Seatruck's Heysham - Warrenpoint route. Clipper Panorama entered service on 25 January 2009, replacing  which was redeployed onto a new route. In December 2011, Clipper Panorama was renamed Seatruck Panorama.

Description
Seatruck Panorama is one of four "P Series" ro-ro freight ferries. Det Norske Veritas class the vessel as a 1A1 General Cargo Carrier - with whom Seatruck Panorama is allocated the number 27191.

The vessel is designed to fit in Heysham harbour ("Heysham max"). Trailers are carried over three decks.

The vessel is powered by two Wärtsilä 4L20 diesel engines which drive two propellers. The vessel is also equipped with two Wärtsilä CT200 bow thrusters.

Sister Vessels
Clipper Pace
Clipper Pennant
Clipper Point

References

External links

Current position of Seatruck Panorama

Ships of Seatruck Ferries
Ferries of the United Kingdom
Merchant ships of Cyprus
2007 ships
Ships built in Spain